Fire Island is located in the eastern Aleutian Islands at . It emerged in 1883, forming a companion island to Bogoslof Island. Originally, this Fire Island was named New Bogoslof (also Grewingk, after an Alaskan geologist).
In 1909, President Theodore Roosevelt made Bogoslof and New Bogoslof a federally protected bird sanctuary. Both islands are currently part of the Bogoslof Wilderness in the Aleutian Islands unit of Alaska Maritime National Wildlife Refuge.

Islands of the Aleutian Islands
Islands of Aleutians West Census Area, Alaska
New islands
Islands of Alaska
Islands of Unorganized Borough, Alaska